Lousteau is a French surname. Notable people with the surname include:

Anne-Marie Lousteau (born 1932), French sprinter
Martín Lousteau (born 1970), Argentine politician

See also
Loustau

French-language surnames